Siwan Junction railway station is a railway station in the city of Siwan, in the state of Bihar.This station is well connected to all major cities of India serving passengers of District Siwan and Gopalganj  .
It is well connected with major cities like Kolkata, Amritsar, Ranchi, Guwahati, Lucknow, Delhi, Kanpur, Jamshedpur and Gorakhpur.

Though this station serves the people of  both Siwan and Gopalganj district, this station is always ignored due to political reasons.

Jurisdiction
It belongs to the Varanasi railway division of the North Eastern Railway Zone of Siwan district in Bihar. The station code is SV. and it serves commuters of both the district Siwan and Gopalganj.

Line
The station lies on the - main line and a line diverges here for Thawe Junction.

Trains
Vaishali Express, Bihar Sampark Kranti Superfast Express,
Arunachal AC Superfast Express, Tatanagar-Thawe Express, Lichchavi Express, Saharsa-Amritsar Garib Rath Express,
Maurya Express are some famous trains passing through Siwan railway station.

Gallery

References

External links

Railway stations in Siwan district
Varanasi railway division
Railway junction stations in Bihar
Siwan, Bihar